Francisco Javier 'Javi' Martos Espigares (born 4 January 1984) is a Spanish footballer who plays for AE Prat as a centre-back.

He spent most of his professional career with Charleroi, having signed with the club in January 2011.

Club career
Born in Alamedilla, Province of Granada, Martos spent one decade in FC Barcelona's youth system, but only represented the C team as a senior. On 20 May 2006 he played his first and only La Liga game, replacing also youth graduate Andrea Orlandi in the second half of a 3–1 loss against Athletic Bilbao at the San Mamés Stadium, as the Frank Rijkaard-led side had already been crowned league champions.

Martos had a brief spell with PFC CSKA Sofia in Bulgaria after being released by the Blaugrana, becoming the first Spaniard to play in the First Professional Football League, then resumed his career in amateur football, first with Girona FC then Atlético Malagueño. In the summer of 2008 summer he joined Iraklis Thessaloniki FC, being first choice and helping the team to back-to-back tenth-place finishes in the Super League Greece.

In early December 2010, Martos went on trial with SD Eibar in his homeland, but nothing came of it. In the following year's winter transfer window, he signed a contract with R. Charleroi S.C. in Belgium.

Martos was relegated from the Pro League in his first year, but achieved promotion in his first full season after only missing three league matches.

References

External links
Charleroi official profile  

1984 births
Living people
Spanish footballers
Footballers from Andalusia
Association football defenders
La Liga players
Segunda División B players
Tercera División players
Segunda Federación players
FC Barcelona C players
FC Barcelona players
Girona FC players
Atlético Malagueño players
FC Andorra players
AE Prat players
First Professional Football League (Bulgaria) players
PFC CSKA Sofia players
Super League Greece players
Iraklis Thessaloniki F.C. players
Belgian Pro League players
Challenger Pro League players
R. Charleroi S.C. players
Spanish expatriate footballers
Expatriate footballers in Bulgaria
Expatriate footballers in Greece
Expatriate footballers in Belgium
Expatriate footballers in Andorra
Spanish expatriate sportspeople in Bulgaria
Spanish expatriate sportspeople in Greece
Spanish expatriate sportspeople in Belgium
Spanish expatriate sportspeople in Andorra